The 2012 MLS SuperDraft was the thirteenth annual SuperDraft presented by Major League Soccer. It was held on January 12, 2012 at 12:00 p.m. (ET). The draft was reduced from three rounds to two with the 19 MLS clubs selecting a total of 38 players. The expansion Montreal Impact had the first overall selection.

Changes from 2011 
 As an expansion club, Montreal received the first pick in the SuperDraft.
 The SuperDraft was contracted from three rounds to two rounds, making it the shortest SuperDraft in terms of rounds.

Selection order 
The official selection order was set by Major League Soccer on October 21, 2011:

 2012 expansion team Montreal Impact received the first selection;
 The eight clubs which did not qualify for the playoffs received picks #2 through #9 (in reverse order of season points);
 The two clubs eliminated in the Wild Card round of playoffs received picks #10 and #11 (in reverse order of season points);
 The four clubs eliminated in the Conference Semifinals received picks #12 through #15 (in reverse order of season points);
 The two clubs eliminated in the Conference Finals received picks #16 and #17 (in reverse order of season points);
 The club which lost the 2011 MLS Cup received pick #18;
 The club which won the 2011 MLS Cup received pick #19.

This selection order held for both rounds of the MLS SuperDraft. The same order was followed for the 2012 MLS Supplemental Draft, which was held on January 17, 2012.

Round 1 
Any player marked with a * is part of the Generation Adidas program.

Round 1 trades

Round 2 
Any player marked with an * is part of the Generation Adidas program.

Round 2 trades

Round 3 and round 4 trades
Prior to the reduction of the 2012 SuperDraft to two rounds, trades were made which involved SuperDraft Round 3 and Round 4 selections.  These selections were converted into 2012 MLS Supplemental Draft Round 1 and Round 2 selections.

Other draft day trades 

 Portland Timbers traded forward Kenny Cooper to New York Red Bulls in exchange for a first-round pick in the 2013 MLS SuperDraft and allocation money.

Notable undrafted players

Homegrown players

References 

Major League Soccer drafts
SuperDraft
MLS SuperDraft
2010s in Kansas City, Missouri
Soccer in Missouri
Sports in Kansas City, Missouri
Events in Kansas City, Missouri
MLS SuperDraft